CODA plc is a mid-sized international financial software company based in the United Kingdom. Founded in 1979, it was purchased in 2008 by Unit4, a supplier of enterprise software, based in the Netherlands. CODA creates, markets and implements a range of business software systems designed for finance directors and finance departments. These include:
 financial management systems like accounting software and procurement software:
 financial analysis applications like reporting, consolidation and planning and budgeting systems;
 financial control systems, like process management and control software for compliance with legislation like Sarbanes Oxley.

History

CODA was founded in Leeds, Yorkshire in 1979 by Rodney Potts and Christopher Lennox and in the early 1990s the company's head office was moved to Harrogate. Today CODA has around 600 employees working from 14 country operations around the world.

In 1994 CODA group PLC was bought by Dutch software company Baan Corporation for £52.9 million ($86.7 million), which wanted to compete in the market for standalone financial software and enhance the existing finance offering. 4

In 2000, Baan got into financial difficulties and the Coda line of business was acquired by one of its main implementation partners, Science Systems in the UK (today SCISYS). The Chippenham-headquartered software and consulting company acquired the trade and assets of CODA in 2000, renaming its holding company CODA SciSys PLC in 2002.

In 2006, CODA SciSys announced a demerger to form two listed companies, CODA (the financial software company) and SciSys (a space and public sector IT company).

In 2008, CODA became part of the Unit 4 Agresso group of companies.

Software

CODA software is designed for multi-currency, multi-language, multi-country, multi-company and multi-site operations, and is used by around 2,600 medium and large organizations in over 100 countries in a variety of markets and within both public and commercial sectors.

See also
 Comparison of accounting software

References

External links 
 CODA

Accounting software
Companies based in Wiltshire
Companies listed on the Alternative Investment Market
ERP software companies
Software companies of the United Kingdom